Pacific Coast Motorsports was a racing team owned by Tyler Tadevic.

Team history

It was founded by Tadevic in 2003 and has competed in the American Le Mans Series, Champ Car Atlantic Series, and Rolex Grand-Am series.

In 2007 it moved to the Champ Car World Series, one of America's premier open-wheel racing divisions, with co-owner Tom Figge and drivers Alex Figge and Ryan Dalziel. Figge was replaced by veteran Roberto Moreno at Houston after Figge was injured at Long Beach. Dalziel was replaced by Mario Dominguez for the final two races of the season.

Due to the reunification of Champ Car and the Indy Racing League, PCM initially announced they would not be fielding any cars in the IRL, but later rescinded the decision in another announcement, April 23, stating that an IndyCar Series team would begin competition starting with the 2008 Indianapolis 500, with Mario Dominguez as driver. It was later revealed that team manager Tyler Tadevic had purchased the team from Figge in order to complete the deal to allow the team to continue operations. Dominguez initially qualified for the 2008 Indy 500, but was "bumped" from the field by a faster car, driven by former race winner Buddy Lazier and Dominguez crashed in a last-ditch effort to requalify. The team made its IndyCar Series debut the following week at the Milwaukee Mile. After a crash at the Texas Motor Speedway race, the team elected to sit out the next two oval races to repair the car and regroup and returned to the series for the next road course race at Watkins Glen International.

In January 2009, the team confirmed a full season 2009 campaign and had reportedly merged with Rubicon Race Team, of which Tadevic was listed as a co-owner. However, the deal fell apart, Rubicon became Rubicon Sports Agency and aligned itself with Conquest Racing and Pacific Coast Motorsports filed for Chapter 7 bankruptcy on May 12. As Tadevic had taken out a second mortgage on his home to buy out Figge, the team's bankruptcy resulted in him losing his home. According to Tadevic, Dominguez's sponsors had only paid a small portion of what they had committed.

Racing Results

Complete Champ Car World Series results
(key)

Complete IRL IndyCar Series results
(key)

 Run to Champ Car specifications.
 Non-points-paying, exhibition race.

References

External links 
Official team website

American auto racing teams
Grand American Road Racing Association teams
American Le Mans Series teams
Champ Car teams
IndyCar Series teams
Companies that have filed for Chapter 7 bankruptcy
Atlantic Championship teams